The 2012–13 Ugandan Big League was the 4th season of the official second tier Ugandan football championship.

Overview
The 2012–13 Uganda Big League was contested by 19 teams divided into two groups. The Elgon Group was won by CRO FC and the Rwenzori Group was won by Bright Stars FC.  The third promotion place went to Soana FC who won the promotion play-off.

Clubs within the Big League enter the Ugandan Cup and Bright Stars FC progressed as far as the Quarter Finals where they were defeated 2-0 away to SC Victoria University, the eventual winners of the competition.

League standings

Elgon Group

Rwenzori Group

Promotion playoff

Semi-finals

Final

Championship playoff

Final

Footnotes

External links
 Uganda - List of Champions - RSSSF (Hans Schöggl)
 Ugandan Football League Tables - League321.com

Ugandan Big League seasons
Uganda
2